The Baia Mare Champions Trophy was a one-off pre-season international women's team handball tournament for clubs, held in Baia Mare, Romania. The competition was hosted by Liga Naţională club HCM Baia Mare and governed by the rules and regulations of the IHF. It was contested by six teams.

Tournaments

See also
Bucharest Trophy

References

 
HCM Baia Mare (women's handball)
International handball competitions hosted by Romania
Sport in Baia Mare
Women's handball in Romania
Recurring sporting events established in 2014
2014 establishments in Romania